Teupah Selatan is a district (Kecamatan) of the Simeulue Regency on Simeulue island in the Indonesian province of Aceh.  As of 2020 it had a total population of 9,030 people.

Administrative divisions
Teupah Selatan is divided administratively into 16 desa / kelurahan:

 Alus Alus
 Ana Ao
 Badegong
 Batu Ralang
 Blang Sebel
 Kebun Baru
 Labuan Bajau
 Labuan Bakti
 Labuhan Jaya
 Lataling
 Latiung
 Pasir Tinggi
 Pulau Bengkalak
 Seuneubok
 Suak Lamatan
 Ulul Mayang

References

Districts of Aceh